Bogdan Stefanović (born 9 July 1977 in Stara Pazova) is a retired Serbian-Slovak football goalkeeper.

Career statistics
2004/2005 - Tatran Prešov - II.League: 29 Matches
2005/2006 - Tatran Prešov - II.League: 13 Matches
2006/2007 - Tatran Prešov - II.League: 03 Matches
2006/2007 - FK Ekranas - A Lyga: 33 Matches
2007/2008 - FK Ekranas - A Lyga: 08 Matches, UEFA-Cup Qualifikation: 1 Match
2008/2009 - FK Ekranas - UI Cup: 03 Matches
2009/2010 - MFK Košice - Corgoň liga: 08 Matches

External links
MFK Košice profile

References

1977 births
Living people
Serbian footballers
Association football goalkeepers
MŠK Rimavská Sobota players
1. FC Tatran Prešov players
FC VSS Košice players
FK Ekranas players
ŠK Futura Humenné players
Slovak Super Liga players
People from Stara Pazova